Sonia M. Altizer (born 1970) is a Professor and Associate Dean of Academic Affairs and the Athletic Association Professor of Ecology in the University of Georgia, Odum School of Ecology.

Early life
Altizer was born as the daughter of Jim and Chris Altizer of Watkinsville, Georgia. Her passion for biology and the natural world began when she received a gift of a microscope and a grow-your-own-butterflies kit on her twelfth birthday.

Education
Altizer received a B.S. from Duke University in 1992 and a Ph.D. from the University of Minnesota in 1998. She also did a postdoctoral work at Princeton University and Cornell University.

Career
For 20 years since a graduate student of the University of Minnesota, Altizer traveled the world to study monarch butterfly migration, ecology, and interactions with a protozoan parasite. She has researched how seasonal migration of these butterflies affects parasite transmission, and also developed collaborative databases of mammalian infectious diseases, on host behavior, ecology, and life history interact with global-scale patterns of parasitism. She also focused her research on songbird-pathogen dynamics, including studies of house finch conjunctivitis, West Nile virus, and salmonellosis. Altizer has published several publications and she recently co-edited a book that would be published in 2015, titled Monarchs in a Changing World: Biology and Conservation of an Iconic Insect. She also and participated in high-level task forces dedicated to monarch butterfly conservation. A citizen science project called Monarch Health is run by her students at University of Georgia, which is now the eighth year. There are hundreds of volunteers across North America in sampling wild monarchs for a debilitating disease.

Research areas
Altizer's research interests are ecology of infectious diseases in natural populations, evolution of host resistance and parasite virulence, insect ecology and evolution, animal migrations, and anthropogenic change and infectious disease dynamics.

Personal life
When Altizer is not on campus or traveling for work, she rides on her horse in rural Watkinsville with her husband, with whom she has two sons.

Publications

 2014 Rushmore, J., Caillaud, D., Hall, R.J., Stumpf, R.M., Meyers, L.A. and Altizer, S. Network-based vaccination improves prospects for disease control in wild chimpanzees. Journal of the Royal Society Interface. 11(97), 20140349
 2013 Altizer, S., Ostfeld, R.S., Harvell, C.D., Johnson, P.T.J., and Kutz, S. Climate change and infectious disease: from evidence to a predictive framework.  Science.  341: 514-519.
 2013 Rushmore, J., D. Caillaud, L. Matamba, R. M. Stumpf, S. P. Borgatti, and S. Altizer. Social network analysis of wild chimpanzees with insights for infectious disease risk. Journal of Animal Ecology, 82: 976-986.
 2012 Streicker, D.G., Recuenco, S., Valderrama, W., Gomez-Benavides, J., Vargas, I., Pacheco, V., Condori, R.E, Montgomery, J., Rupprecht, C.E., Rohani, P. and Altizer, S. Ecological and anthropogenic drivers of rabies exposure in vampire bats: implications for transmission and control. Proceedings of the Royal Society Series B. 279(1742):3384-92.
 2011 Altizer, S., Han, B and Bartel, R. Animal migrations and infectious disease risk. Science. 331: 296-302
 2010 Altizer, S., and Davis, A.K. Populations of monarch butterflies with different migratory behaviors show divergence in wing morphology. Evolution. In Press.
 2010 DeRoode, JC and Altizer, S. Host-parasite genetic interactions and virulence-transmission relationships in natural populations of monarch butterflies. Evolution. In press.
 2009 Harvell, C.D., Altizer, S., Cattadori, I., Harrington, L. and Weil, E. Climate change and wildlife diseases: when does the host matter the most? Ecology. 90: 912-920.
 2008 De Roode, J.C., Yates, A.J. and Altizer, S. Virulence-transmission trade-offs and population divergence in virulence in a naturally-occurring butterfly parasite. PNAS. 105: 7489-7494
 2008 Bradley, C.A., Gibbs, S.E.J. and Altizer, S.  Urban land use predicts West Nile virus exposure in songbirds. Ecological applications. 18: 1083–1092

Honors and awards

 2018: Lamar Dodd Award Creative Research Award
 2014: UGA Athletic Association Professor of Ecology
 2012: Odum School of Ecology Faculty Instructor of the Year Award
 2008: Presidential Early Career Award in Science and Engineering (PECASE)
 2008: University of Georgia Award for Teaching Excellence
 2008: Odum School of Ecology Award for Teaching Excellence

References

External links
 
 Infectious Disease Ecology in the Altizer Lab 
 

Category:ISI highly cited researchers

University of Georgia faculty
Animal migration
Living people
American ecologists
Women ecologists
Environmental scientists
20th-century American women scientists
20th-century American scientists
1970 births
Duke University alumni
University of Minnesota alumni
American women academics
21st-century American women
Recipients of the Presidential Early Career Award for Scientists and Engineers